Islam is historically divided into two major sects, Sunni and Shia Islam, each with its own sub-sects. Large numbers of Shia Arab Muslims live in some Arab countries including Lebanon, Yemen, Bahrain, Iraq, Saudi Arabia, Kuwait, Oman, the UAE, and Qatar. Shia Muslims are a numerical majority in Iraq and Bahrain. Approximately 35% of the population in Yemen and half of the Muslims in Lebanon are Shia Muslims. There is also a very large population of Shia Muslims living in the Persian Gulf countries especially in Saudi Arabia. The majority of the population of the Eastern Province of Saudi Arabia are Shia Muslims. Although Saudi government statistics claim that roughly only 20-40% of the Muslim population are Shia Muslims, the authenticity of this figure has been disputed. Recent reports and investigations indicate that there is, in fact, a much larger population of Shia Muslims present, with estimated figures of over 45% or even making up the majority of the Muslim population. Saudi Arabia officially follows Wahhabism, a strict, recently established sect of Sunni Islam. There is little freedom of religion between the different sects even whilst all of the population are Muslims. Smaller Shia groups are present in Egypt and Jordan. Despite the heavy presence of Shia Muslims in some Arab countries, particularly among the population of the Persian Gulf Arab countries, they have been treated poorly throughout history.  Additionally, in recent times, Shia Muslims along with Kurds have faced genocide by the pan-Arabist regime of Saddam Hussein.  For both historical and political reasons, Shi'a Arabs have fared relative poorly in much of the Arab world, and the topic of Shi‘ism and Shia groups is one of the most sensitive issues for the Sunni elite.

Yemen 

Arab Shiites in Yemen have been traditionally suppressed, often violently. Massacres have taken place by government forces using tanks and airplanes to obliterate the uprising of Shī‘a groups in the country. Shias make up about 35% of citizens of Yemen.

Saudi Arabia 

The Shias of Saudi Arabia form a majority in Eastern Province, although large numbers are scattered throughout the kingdom. According to recent reports, Shias make up between 10%-15% of total population of kingdom.

Iraq 

Iraqi Shia majority is predominantly situated in the central and southern part of Iraq, in Baghdad (the capital) and all throughout the center and the south. 

Saddam Hussein and his 15 former aides, including Ali Hassan al-Majid, were held responsible for their role in the suppression of a Shia uprising and the deaths of 60,000 to 100,000 people. The trial took place in Baghdad in August 2007. Al-Majid had been already sentenced to death in June 2007 for genocide against the Kurds.

Unlike other sects of Islam, the Shias of Iraq have been treated horrifically under the regime of Saddam Hussein, when many Iraqi Shī‘as of Persian descent were expelled from the country in the 1980s, despite being the majority of the country at 60%.  Reports indicated that no neighborhood was left intact after the 1991 uprising in Karbala. In the vicinity of the shrines of Husayn ibn Ali and Abbas ibn Ali, most of the buildings surrounding the shrines were completely reduced to rubble. The shrines themselves were scarred from bullet marks and tank fire. They were, however, quickly restored by Shiite Donations.

In December 2005, workers maintaining water pipes 500 meters from the Imam Hussein Shrine unearthed a mass grave containing dozens of bodies, apparently those of Shiites killed after the uprising.

Egypt

According to Brian Whitaker, in Egypt, the small Shia population is harassed by the authorities and treated with suspicion, being arrested - ostensibly for security reasons - and subjected to abuse by state security officers for their religious beliefs. Estimated numbers of Egypt’s Shias range from two to three million.

Lebanon 

The most recent demographic study conducted by Statistics Lebanon, a Beirut-based research firm, found that 28% of Lebanon's population is Shia Muslim. The
Shia are the only sect that has ever had the post of Speaker of Parliament. The Shia Muslims are largely concentrated in northern and western Beqaa, Southern Lebanon and in the southern suburbs of Beirut.

United Arab Emirates

10% of Emirati citizens belong to the Shia sect. In addition, Shia Islam is also practiced among the country's large Iranian community and other Muslim expatriate groups.

Qatar

Shiites comprise around 10% of Qatar's Muslim population.

Kuwait

20-25% of Kuwaiti citizens are Shia Muslims.

Bahrain

Shias make up 55-60% of Bahraini Muslim population, the ruling absolute monarchy is Sunni.

References

See also
Shia-Sunni relations

Arab
Islam in the Arab world